Vulkon Entertainment was an entertainment company which specialized in science fiction-related fan conventions. Founded by Joe Motes and Ruthanne Devlin in 1986, Vulkon produced its first convention in 1987 (making Vulkon and its predecessor Trekon one of the oldest and longest-running conventions in the state of Florida). Vulkon Entertainment organized five to ten conventions each year in many cities across America, as well as science fiction-themed cruises. The conventions were often Star Trek-centric, but usually included actors from other science fiction television series.

Overview
Vulkon conventions programming included cosplay, dances, panels, workshops, game shows, banquets, karaoke, video games, artist alley, a dealers room, and once (the Halloween 2008 show) even hosted an actual wedding done in traditional Klingon fashion.

Vulkon historically attracted 1,000-3,000 visitors from all over the United States. However, in the face of the American economic recession of 2008 and 2009 the number of visitors started to dwindle, and the choice was made to cancel the first two shows of 2009, which had been scheduled for March of that year. The Vulkon franchise was officially put on hiatus shortly thereafter.

History 
Co-founder Joe Motes had produced prior conventions under different names as far back as October 31, 1976, at the Howard Johnson's, in Golden Glades, Florida, featuring a costume party/contest, bloopers, dealers, etc. In June 1984. Joe Motes organized "Trekon".

In 1986, Motes teamed up with Ruthanne Devlin in Miami to form Vulkon Entertainment. The first official Vulkon was held in Orlando in October 1987.

Between 1987 and 2007, Vulkon produced 12 Star Trek / Buffy the Vampire Slayer cruises, sailing with 8-15 stars on each cruise under the names "Trekruise", "Seatrek" and "Slayercruise".

From 1996 to 2000, Vulkon Entertainment teamed up with actor William Campbell to promote five "Fantasticons". raising over $400,000 for the Motion Picture & Television Country House and Hospital. Each of these conventions drew hundreds of stars and thousands of fans.

In 1999, Devlin sold her half of the company to Motes and retired to Seattle, Washington. In 1999, Fernando Martinez became partners with Motes until 2005. Ruthanne Devlin died on February 10, 2015.

In 2007, the Vulkon company and name were sold to Gary and Terri Tripp of Weston, Florida. When Joe Motes retired, he was the second longest-running promoter in America next to Creation Entertainment promoters Gary Berman and Adam Malin.

Event history

Cruises

References

Defunct science fiction conventions in the United States
Pembroke Pines, Florida